Alexander Morozov may refer to:

 Alexander Alexandrovich Morozov (1904–1979), Soviet tank designer
 Alexander Alexandrovich Morozov (artist) (born 1974), Russian artist
 Alexander Ivanovich Morozov (1835–1904), Russian genre painter
 Alexander Morozov (composer) (born 1948), Soviet pop composer
 Aleksandr Morozov (athlete) (born 1939), Soviet middle-distance runner

See also
 Morozov (surname)